Tribal Research Institute Museum, Museum of Tribal Arts and Artifacts, is a museum in Bhubaneswar, Odisha inside the campus of Scheduled Castes & Scheduled Tribes Research & Training Institute.  It is popularly known as Tribal Museum and conceptually labeled as Museum of Man. It has life-sized authentic tribal dwellings, created by the tribal craftsmen offers a view of the State's tribal heritage. It has sections which showcase tribal artifacts and objects, focusing on well researched, documented cultural life of tribals of Odisha. It is headed by a Director, who is in the rank of a University Professor, and the administrative control lies in the hands of ST, SC, Minorities, and Backward Classes Welfare Department, Government of Odisha.

This Museum is an integrated part of the Scheduled Castles and Scheduled Tribes Research and Training Institute (SCSTRTI), which disseminates knowledge covering the human species in totality.

History
Conceptually labeled as "Museum of Man", it was established in the year 1953. In 1986, 5 tribal huts, representing Santal, Juang, Gadaba, Saora and Kandha communities, were constructed and the tribal artifacts were displayed here for visitors. On 5 March 2001, the new museum building was inaugurated.

Halls
There are 5 halls in the museum and the displays are categorised the following way -

 Hall I - Personal Adornments
 Hall II - Personal Belongings, Arts, Paintings & Photographs
 Hall III - Hunting & Fishing Implements & Weapons of Offence and Defense
 Hall IV - Household Objects and Agricultural Implements
 Hall V - Dance, Musical Instruments and Dhokra Items

References

Museums in Bhubaneswar
Anthropology museums
Tribal art
1953 establishments in Orissa
Museums established in 1953
Art museums and galleries in India
History museums in India